Podalia tympania is a moth of the family Megalopygidae. It was described by Herbert Druce in 1897. It has been recorded from Peru and Mexico.

The forewings and hindwings are pale brown, the forewings with the costal margin and the spaces between the veins on the costal half of the wing streaked with white. The fringe of both wings is pale brown.

References

Moths described in 1897
Megalopygidae